The Austronesian peoples, sometimes referred to as Austronesian-speaking peoples, are a large group of peoples in Taiwan, Maritime Southeast Asia, Micronesia, coastal New Guinea, Island Melanesia, Polynesia, and Madagascar that speak Austronesian languages. They also include indigenous ethnic minorities in Vietnam, Cambodia, Myanmar, Thailand, Hainan, the Comoros, and the Torres Strait Islands.  The nations and territories predominantly populated by Austronesian-speaking peoples are sometimes known collectively as Austronesia.

They originated from a prehistoric seaborne migration, known as the Austronesian expansion from pre-Han Taiwan, at around 1500 to 1000 BCE. Austronesians reached the northernmost Philippines, specifically the Batanes Islands, by around 2200 BCE. Austronesians used sails some time before 2000 BCE. In conjunction with their use of other maritime technologies (notably catamarans, outrigger boats, lashed-lug boat building, and the crab claw sail), this enabled their dispersal into the islands of the Indo-Pacific, culminating in the settlement of New Zealand . From 2000 BCE they assimilated (or were assimilated by) the earlier Paleolithic pre-Austronesian, and Australo-Melanesian Papuan populations. They reached as far as Easter Island to the east, Madagascar to the west, and New Zealand to the south. At the furthest extent, they might have also reached the Americas.

Aside from language, Austronesian peoples widely share cultural characteristics, including such traditions and technologies as tattooing, stilt houses, jade carving, wetland agriculture, and various rock art motifs. They also share domesticated plants and animals that were carried along with the migrations, including rice, bananas, coconuts, breadfruit, Dioscorea yams, taro, paper mulberry, chickens, pigs, and dogs.

History of research

The linguistic connections between Madagascar, Polynesia, and Southeast Asia, particularly the remarkable similarities between Malagasy, Malay, and Polynesian numerals, were recognized early in the colonial era by European authors. The first formal publication on these relationships was in 1708 by Dutch Orientalist Adriaan Reland, who recognized a "common language" from Madagascar to western Polynesia, although Dutch explorer Cornelis de Houtman observed linguistic links between Madagascar and the Malay Archipelago a century earlier in 1603. German naturalist Johann Reinhold Forster, who traveled with James Cook on his second voyage, also recognized the similarities of Polynesian languages to those of Island Southeast Asia. In his book Observations Made during a Voyage round the World (1778), he posited that the ultimate origins of the Polynesians might have been the lowland regions of the Philippines and proposed that they arrived to the islands via long-distance voyaging. But, Johann Reinhold's Observations Made During a Voyage Round the World (1778) and Georg's A Voyage Round the World (1777), mark a key moment in the beginnings of modern racism. "Employing the English word "race" as a synonym for human variety, they interpret the multiplicity of Polynesian culture in terms of a linear hierarchy that naturally ascends towards the white European ideal."

The Spanish philologist Lorenzo Hervás later devoted a large part of his Idea dell'universo (1778–1787) to the establishment of a language family linking the Malay Peninsula, the Maldives, Madagascar, Indonesia (Sunda Islands and Moluccas), the Philippines, and the Pacific Islands eastward to Easter Island. Multiple other authors corroborated this classification (except for the erroneous inclusion of Maldivian), and the language family came to be known as "Malayo-Polynesian," first coined by the German linguist Franz Bopp in 1841 (German: malayisch-polynesisch). The connections between Southeast Asia, Madagascar, and the Pacific Islands were also noted by other European explorers, including the orientalist William Marsden and the naturalist Johann Reinhold Forster.

Johann Friedrich Blumenbach added Austronesians as the fifth category to his "varieties" of humans in the second edition of De Generis Humani Varietate Nativa (1781). He initially grouped them by geography and thus called Austronesians the "people from the southern world." In the third edition published in 1795, he named Austronesians the "Malay race" or the "brown race," after correspondence with Joseph Banks who was part of the first voyage of James Cook. Blumenbach used the term "Malay" due to his belief that most Austronesians spoke the "Malay idiom" (i.e. the Austronesian languages), though he inadvertently caused the later confusion of his racial category with the Malay (ethnic group). The other varieties Blumenbach identified were the "Caucasians" (white), "Mongolians" (yellow), "Ethiopians" (black), and "Americans" (red). Blumenbach's definition of the Malay race is largely identical to the modern distribution of the Austronesian peoples, including not only Islander Southeast Asians, but also the people of Madagascar and the Pacific Islands. Although Blumenbach's work was later used in scientific racism, Blumenbach was a monogenist and did not believe the human "varieties" were inherently inferior to each other.

By the 19th century, however, scientific racism was favoring a classification of Austronesians as being a subset of the "Mongolian" race, as well as polygenism. The Australo-Melanesian populations of Southeast Asia and Melanesia (whom Blumenbach initially classified as a "subrace" of the "Malay" race) were also now being treated as a separate "Ethiopian" race by authors like Georges Cuvier, Conrad Malte-Brun (who first coined the term "Oceania" as Océanique), Julien-Joseph Virey, and René Lesson.

The British naturalist James Cowles Prichard originally followed Blumenbach by treating Papuans and Indigenous Australians as being descendants of the same stock as Austronesians. But by his third edition of Researches into the Physical History of Man (1836–1847), his work had become more racialized due to the influence of polygenism. He classified the peoples of Austronesia into two groups: the "Malayo-Polynesians" (roughly equivalent to the Austronesian peoples) and the "Kelænonesians" (roughly equivalent to the Australo-Melanesians). He further subdivided the latter into the "Alfourous" (also "Haraforas" or "Alfoërs", the Native Australians), and the "Pelagian or Oceanic Negroes" (the Melanesians and western Polynesians). Despite this, he acknowledges that "Malayo-Polynesians" and "Pelagian Negroes" had "remarkable characters in common", particularly in terms of language and craniometry.

In linguistics, the Malayo-Polynesian language family also initially excluded Melanesia and Micronesia, due to what they perceived were marked physical differences between the inhabitants of these regions from the Malayo-Polynesian speakers. However, there was growing evidence of their linguistic relationship to Malayo-Polynesian languages, notably from studies on the Melanesian languages by Georg von der Gabelentz, Robert Henry Codrington and Sidney Herbert Ray. Codrington coined and used the term "Ocean" language family rather than "Malayo-Polynesian" in 1891, in opposition to the exclusion of Melanesian and Micronesian languages. This was adopted by Ray who defined the "Oceanic" language family as encompassing the languages of Southeast Asia and Madagascar, Micronesia, Melanesia, and Polynesia.

In 1899, the Austrian linguist and ethnologist Wilhelm Schmidt coined the term "Austronesian" (German: austronesisch, from Latin auster, "south wind"; and Greek νῆσος, "island") to refer to the language family. Schmidt had the same motivations as Codrington. He proposed the term as a replacement to "Malayo-Polynesian", because he also opposed the implied exclusion of the languages of Melanesia and Micronesia in the latter name. It became the accepted name for the language family, with Oceanic and Malayo-Polynesian languages being retained as names for subgroups.

The term "Austronesian", or more accurately "Austronesian-speaking peoples", came to refer the people who speak the languages of the Austronesian language family. Some authors, however, object to the use of the term to refer to people, as they question whether there really is any biological or cultural shared ancestry between all Austronesian-speaking groups. This is especially true for authors who reject the prevailing "Out of Taiwan" hypothesis and instead offer scenarios where the Austronesian languages spread among preexisting static populations through borrowing or convergence, with little or no population movements.

Despite these objections, the general consensus is that the archeological, cultural, genetic, and especially linguistic evidence all separately indicate varying degrees of shared ancestry among Austronesian-speaking peoples that justifies their treatment as a "phylogenetic unit." This has led to the use of the term "Austronesian" in academic literature to refer not only to the Austronesian languages, but also the Austronesian-speaking peoples, their societies, and the geographic area of Austronesia.

Some Austronesian-speaking groups are not direct descendants of Austronesians and acquired their languages through language shift, but this is believed to have happened only in a few instances since the Austronesian expansion was too rapid for language shifts to have occurred fast enough. In parts of Island Melanesia, migrations and paternal admixture from Papuan groups after the Austronesian expansion (estimated to have started at around 500 BCE) also resulted in gradual population turnover. These secondary migrations were incremental, and happened gradually enough that the culture and language of these groups remained Austronesian, even though in modern times they are genetically more Papuan. In the vast majority of cases, the language and material culture of Austronesian-speaking groups descend directly through generational continuity, especially in islands that were previously uninhabited.

Serious research into the Austronesian languages and its speakers has been ongoing since the 19th century. Modern scholarship on Austronesian dispersion models is generally credited to two influential papers in the late 20th century: The Colonisation of the Pacific: A Genetic Trail (Hill & Serjeantson, eds., 1989), and The Austronesian Dispersal and the Origin of Languages (Bellwood, 1991). The topic is particularly interesting to scientists for the remarkably unique characteristics of the Austronesian speakers: their extent, diversity, and rapid dispersal.

Regardless certain disagreements still exist among researchers with regards to chronology, origin, dispersal, adaptations to the island environments, interactions with preexisting populations in areas they settled, and cultural developments over time. The mainstream accepted hypothesis is the "Out of Taiwan" model first proposed by Peter Bellwood. But there are multiple rival models that create a sort of "pseudo-competition" among their supporters due to narrow focus on data from limited geographic areas or disciplines. The most notable of which is the "Out of Sundaland" (or "Out of Island Southeast Asia") model. As a generalization, authors that are based in Indonesia and Malaysia tend to favor the "Out of Sundaland" model, while authors based in Taiwan and the Pacific Islands tend to favor the "Out of Taiwan" model.

Geographical distribution

Prior to the 16th century Colonial Era, the Austronesian language family was the most widespread language family in the world, spanning half the planet from Easter Island in the eastern Pacific Ocean to Madagascar in the western Indian Ocean.

It is spoken today by about 386 million people (4.9% of the global population), making it the fifth-largest language family by number of speakers. Major Austronesian languages with the highest number of speakers are Malay (around 250–270 million in Indonesia alone in its own literary standard named "Indonesian"), Javanese, and Filipino (Tagalog). The family contains 1,257 languages, which is the second most of any language family.

The geographic region that encompasses native Austronesian-speaking populations is sometimes referred to as Austronesia. Other geographic names for various subregions include Malay Peninsula, Greater Sunda Islands, Lesser Sunda Islands, Island Melanesia, Island Southeast Asia (ISEA), Malay Archipelago, Maritime Southeast Asia (MSEA), Melanesia, Micronesia, Near Oceania, Oceania, Pacific Islands, Remote Oceania, Polynesia, and Wallacea. In Indonesia, the nationalistic term Nusantara from the Old Javanese is also popularly used for their islands.

Historically, Austronesians uniquely live in an "island world". Austronesian regions are almost exclusively islands in the Pacific and Indian oceans, with predominantly tropical or subtropical climates with considerable seasonal rainfall. They had limited penetration into the interiors of large islands or mainlands.

They include Taiwanese indigenous peoples, the majority of ethnic groups in Brunei, East Timor, Indonesia, Madagascar, Malaysia, Micronesia, the Philippines, and Polynesia. Also included are the Malays of Singapore; the Polynesians of New Zealand, Hawaii, and Chile; the Torres Strait Islanders of Australia; the non-Papuan peoples of Melanesia and coastal New Guinea; the Shibushi-speakers of Comoros, and the Malagasy and Shibushi-speakers of Réunion. They are also found in the regions of Southern Thailand; the Cham areas in Vietnam and Cambodia, and Hainan; and the Mergui Archipelago of Myanmar.

Additionally, modern-era migration brought Austronesian-speaking people to the United States, Canada, Australia, the United Kingdom, mainland Europe, Cocos (Keeling) Islands, South Africa, Sri Lanka, Suriname, Hong Kong, Macau, and West Asian countries.

Some authors also propose further settlements and contacts in the past in areas that are not inhabited by Austronesian speakers today. These range from likely hypotheses to very controversial claims with minimal evidence. In 2009, Roger Blench compiled an expanded map of Austronesia that encompass these claims based on various evidence like historical accounts, loanwords, introduced plants and animals, genetics, archeological sites, and material culture. They include areas like the Pacific coast of the Americas, Japan, the Yaeyama Islands, the Australian coast, Sri Lanka and coastal South Asia, the Persian Gulf, some of the Indian Ocean islands, East Africa, South Africa, and West Africa.

List of Austronesian peoples

Austronesian peoples include the following groupings by name and geographic location (incomplete):
 Formosan: Taiwan (e.g., Amis, Atayal, Bunun, Paiwan, collectively known as Taiwanese indigenous peoples).
 Malayo-Polynesian:
 Borneo groups (e.g., Kadazan-Dusun, Murut, Iban, Bidayuh, Dayak, Lun Bawang/Lundayeh).
 Chamic group: Cambodia, Hainan, Cham areas of Vietnam (remnants of the Champa kingdom which covered central and southern Vietnam) as well as Aceh in northern Sumatra (e.g., Acehnese, Chams, Jarai, Utsuls).
 Central Luzon group: (e.g., Kapampangan, Sambal).
 Igorot (Cordillerans): Cordilleras (e.g., Balangao, Ibaloi, Ifugao, Itneg, Kankanaey).
Lumad: Mindanao (e.g., Kamayo, Mandaya, Mansaka, Kalagan, Manobo, Tasaday, T'boli).
Malagasy: Madagascar (e.g., Betsileo, Merina, Sihanaka, Bezanozano).
 Melanesians: Melanesia (e.g., Fijians, Kanak, Ni-Vanuatu, Solomon Islands).
 Micronesians: Micronesia (e.g., Carolinian, Chamorro, Palauans).
 Moken: Burma, Thailand.
 Moro: Bangsamoro (Mindanao & Sulu Archipelago, e.g., Maguindanao, Iranun, Maranao, Tausug, Yakan,  Sama-Bajau).
 Northern Luzon lowlanders (e.g., Ilocano, Pangasinan, Ibanag, Itawes).
 Polynesians: Polynesia (e.g., Māori, Native Hawaiians, Samoans, Tongans).
 Southern Luzon lowlanders (e.g., Tagalog, Bicolano).
Sunda–Sulawesi language and ethnic groups including Malay, Sundanese, Javanese, Balinese, Batak (geographically includes Malaysia, Brunei, Pattani, Singapore, Cocos (Keeling) Islands, parts of Sri Lanka, southern Myanmar, and much of western and central Indonesia).
 Visayans: Visayas and neighbouring islands (e.g., Aklanon, Boholano, Cebuano, Hiligaynon, Masbateño, Waray).

Prehistory 

The broad consensus on Austronesian origins is the "two-layer model" where an original Paleolithic indigenous population in Island Southeast Asia were assimilated to varying degrees by incoming migrations of Neolithic Austronesian-speaking peoples from Taiwan and Fujian, in southern China from around 4,000 BP. Austronesians also mixed with other preexisting populations as well as later migrant populations among the islands they settled, resulting in further genetic input. The most notable are the Austroasiatic-speaking peoples in western Island Southeast Asia (peninsular Malaysia, Sumatra, Borneo, and Java); the Bantu peoples in Madagascar and the Comoros; as well as Japanese, Persian, Indian, Arab, and Han Chinese traders and migrants in the more recent centuries.

Paleolithic

Island Southeast Asia was settled by modern humans in the Paleolithic following coastal migration routes, presumably starting before 70,000 BP, long before the development of Austronesian cultures. These populations are typified by having dark skin, curly hair, and short statures, leading Europeans to believe, in the 19th century, that they were related to African Pygmies. However, despite these physical differences, genetic studies have shown that they are more closely related to other Eurasian populations than to Africans.

These early population groups originally lacked sophisticated watercraft technology, and thus could only cross narrow interisland seas with simple floats or rafts (likely bamboo or log rafts) or through accidental means. Especially the deeper waters of the Wallace Line, Weber Line, and Lydekker Line left some significant islands disconnected from mainland Asia in the lower sea levels of the last glacial period. They settled in what are now islands mostly through land migrations into the coastal lowland plains of Sundaland and Sahul, most of which are now underwater.

Humans reached the islands in Wallacea as well as the Sahul landmass (Australia and New Guinea) by around 53,000 BP (some give even older dates up to 65,000 BP). By 45,400 years ago, humans had reached the Bismarck Archipelago in Near Oceania. They were once also present in mainland China and Taiwan, but their populations are now extinct or assimilated. The oldest confirmed human fossils in the Philippines is from the Tabon Caves of Palawan, dated to around 47,000 BP.
Previously, it was believed that the earliest putative record of modern humans in Southeast Asia is from the Callao Cave of northern Luzon in the Philippines dated to around 67,000 BP. However, in 2019, the remains were identified as belonging to a new species of archaic humans, Homo luzonensis.

These people are generally historically referred to as "Australo-Melanesians", though the terminology is problematic as they are genetically diverse and most groups within Austronesia have significant Austronesian admixture and culture. The unmixed descendants of these groups today include the interior Papuans and Indigenous Australians.

In modern literature, descendants of these groups located in Island Southeast Asia west of Halmahera are usually collectively referred to as "Negritos", while descendants of these groups east of Halmahera (excluding Indigenous Australians) are referred to as "Papuans". They can also be divided into two broad groups based on Denisovan admixture. Philippine Negritos, Papuans, Melanesians, and Indigenous Australians display Denisovan admixture; while Malaysian and western Indonesian Negritos (Orang Asli) and Andamanese islanders do not.

Mahdi (2017) also uses the term "Qata" (from Proto-Malayo-Polynesian *qata) to distinguish the indigenous populations of Southeast Asia, versus "Tau" (from Proto-Austronesian *Cau) for the later settlers from Taiwan and mainland China; both are based on proto-forms for the word "person" in Malayo-Polynesian languages that referred to darker-skinned and lighter-skinned groups respectively. Jinam et al. (2017) also proposed the term "First Sundaland People" in place of "Negrito", as a more accurate name for the original population of Southeast Asia.

These populations are genetically distinct from later Austronesians, but through fairly extensive population admixture, most modern Austronesians have varying levels of ancestry from these groups. The same is true for some populations historically considered "non-Austronesians" due to physical differences; like Philippine Negritos, Orang Asli, and Austronesian-speaking Melanesians, all of whom have Austronesian admixture. In Polynesians in Remote Oceania, for example, the admixture is around 20 to 30% Papuan, and 70 to 80% Austronesian. The Melanesians in Near Oceania are roughly around 20% Austronesian and 80% Papuan, while in the natives of the Lesser Sunda Islands, the admixture is around 50% Austronesian and 50% Papuan. Similarly, in the Philippines, the groups traditionally considered to be "Negrito" vary between 30 and 50% Austronesian.

The high degree of assimilation among Austronesian, Negrito, and Papuan groups indicate that the Austronesian expansion was largely peaceful. Rather than violent displacement, the settlers and the indigenous groups absorbed each other. It is believed that in some cases, like in the Toalean culture of Sulawesi (c. 8,000–1,500 BP), it is even more accurate to say that the densely-populated indigenous hunter-gatherer groups absorbed the incoming Austronesian farmers, rather than the other way around. Mahdi (2016) further asserts that Proto-Malayo-Polynesian *tau-mata ("person") is derived from a composite protoform *Cau ma-qata, combining "Tau" and "Qata" and indicative of the mixing the two ancestral population types in these regions.

Neolithic China

The broad consensus on the Urheimat (homeland) of Austronesian languages as well as the Neolithic early Austronesian peoples is accepted to be Taiwan, as well as the Penghu Islands. They are believed to have descended from ancestral populations in coastal mainland southern China, which are generally referred to as the "preAustronesians". Through these pre-Austronesians, Austronesians may also share a common ancestry with neighboring groups in Neolithic southern China.

These Neolithic pre-Austronesians from the coast of southeastern China are believed to have migrated to Taiwan between approximately 10,000–6000 BCE. Other research has suggested that, according to radiocarbon dates, Austronesians may have migrated from mainland China to Taiwan as late as 4000 BCE (Dapenkeng culture). They continued to maintain regular contact with the mainland until 1500 BCE.

The identity of the Neolithic pre-Austronesian cultures in China is contentious. Tracing Austronesian prehistory in Fujian and Taiwan has been difficult due to the southward expansion of the Han dynasty (2nd century BCE), and the recent Qing dynasty annexation of Taiwan (1683 CE). Today, the only Austronesian language in southern China is Tsat language in Hainan. The politicization of archaeology is also problematic, particularly erroneous reconstructions among some Chinese archaeologists of non-Sinitic sites as Han. Some authors, favoring the "Out of Sundaland" model like William Meacham, reject the southern Chinese mainland origin of pre-Austronesians entirely.

Nevertheless, based on linguistic, archaeological, and genetic evidence, Austronesians are most strongly associated with the early farming cultures of the Yangtze River basin that domesticated rice from around 13,500 to 8,200 BP. They display typical Austronesian technological hallmarks, including tooth removal, teeth blackening, jade carving, tattooing, stilt houses, advanced boat-building, aquaculture, wetland agriculture, and the domestication of dogs, pigs, and chickens. These include the Kuahuqiao, Hemudu, Majiabang, Songze, Liangzhu, and Dapenkeng cultures which occupied the coastal regions between the Yangtze River delta to the Min River delta.

Relations with other groups

Based on linguistic evidence, there have been proposals linking Austronesians with other linguistic families into linguistic macrofamilies that are relevant to the identity of the pre-Austronesian populations. The most notable are the connections of Austronesians to the neighboring Austroasiatic, Kra-Dai, and Sinitic peoples (as Austric, Austro-Tai, and Sino-Austronesian, respectively). But they are still not widely accepted as evidence of these relationships are still tenuous and the methods used are highly contentious.

In support of both the Austric and Austro-Tai hypothesis, Robert Blust connects the lower Yangtze Neolithic Austro-Tai entity with the rice-cultivating Austroasiatic cultures; assuming the center of East Asian rice domestication, and putative Austric homeland, to be located in the Yunnan/Burma border area, instead of the Yangtze River basin as is currently accepted. Under that view, there was an east–west genetic alignment, resulting from a rice-based population expansion, in the southern part of East Asia: Austroasiatic-Kra-Dai-Austronesian, with unrelated Sino-Tibetan occupying a more northerly tier. Depending on the author, other hypotheses have also included other language families like Hmong-Mien and even Japanese-Ryukyuan into the larger Austric hypothesis.

While the Austric hypothesis remains contentious, there is genetic evidence that at least in western Island Southeast Asia there had been earlier Neolithic overland migrations (pre-4,000 BP) by Austroasiatic-speaking peoples into what is now the Greater Sunda Islands when the sea levels were lower in the early Holocene. These peoples were assimilated linguistically and culturally by incoming Austronesian peoples in what is now modern-day Indonesia and Malaysia.

Several authors have also proposed that Kra-Dai speakers may actually be an ancient daughter subgroup of Austronesians that migrated back to the Pearl River delta from Taiwan and/or Luzon shortly after the Austronesian expansion. Later migrating further westwards to Hainan, Mainland Southeast Asia and Northeast India. They propose that the distinctiveness of Kra-Dai (it is tonal and monosyllabic) was the result of linguistic restructuring due to contact with Hmong-Mien and Sinitic cultures. Aside from linguistic evidence, Roger Blench has also noted cultural similarities between the two groups, like facial tattooing, tooth removal or ablation, teeth blackening, snake (or dragon) cults, and the multiple-tongued jaw harps shared by the Indigenous Taiwanese and Kra-Dai-speakers. However archaeological evidence for this is still sparse. This is believed to be similar to what happened to the Cham people, who were originally Austronesian settlers (likely from Borneo) to southern Vietnam at around 2,100 to 1,900 BP, and had languages similar to Malay. Their languages underwent several restructuring events to syntax and phonology due to contact with the nearby tonal languages of Mainland Southeast Asia and Hainan. Although the populations of the Malay peninsula, Sumatra, Java, and neighboring islands are Austronesian-speaking, they have significantly high admixture from Mainland Southeast Asian populations. These areas were already populated (most probably by speakers of Austroasiatic languages) before they were reached by the Austronesian expansion roughly 3000 years ago. Currently, only the indigenous Aslians still speak Austroasiatic languages. However, some of the languages in the region show signs of underlying Austroasiatic substrates.

According to Juha Janhunen and Ann Kumar, Austronesians may have also settled parts of southern Japan, especially on the islands of Kyushu and Shikoku, and influenced or created the "Japanese-hierarchical society". It is suggested that Japanese tribes like the Hayato people, the Kumaso and the Azumi people were of Austronesian origin. Until today, local traditions and festivals show similarities to the Malayo-Polynesian culture.

The Sino-Austronesian hypothesis, on the other hand, is a relatively new hypothesis by Laurent Sagart, first proposed in 1990. It argues for a north–south linguistic genetic relationship between Chinese and Austronesian. This is based on sound correspondences in the basic vocabulary and morphological parallels. Sagart places special significance in shared vocabulary on cereal crops, citing them as evidence of shared linguistic origin. However, this has largely been rejected by other linguists. The sound correspondences between Old Chinese and Proto-Austronesian can also be explained as a result of the Longshan interaction sphere, when pre-Austronesians from the Yangtze region came into regular contact with Proto-Sinitic speakers in the Shandong Peninsula at around the 4th to 3rd millennia BCE. This corresponded with the widespread introduction of rice cultivation to Proto-Sinitic speakers and conversely, millet cultivation to Pre-Austronesians. An Austronesian substratum in formerly Austronesian territories that have been Sinicized after the Iron Age Han expansion is also another explanation for the correspondences that do not require a genetic relationship.

In relation to Sino-Austronesian models and the Longshan interaction sphere, Roger Blench (2014) suggests that the single migration model for the spread of the Neolithic into Taiwan is problematic, pointing out the genetic and linguistic inconsistencies between different Taiwanese Austronesian groups. The surviving Austronesian populations on Taiwan should rather be considered as the result of various Neolithic migration waves from the mainland and back migration from the Philippines. These incoming migrants almost certainly spoke languages related to Austronesian or pre-Austronesian, although their phonology and grammar would have been quite diverse.

Blench considers the Austronesians in Taiwan to have been a melting pot of immigrants from various parts of the coast of East China that had been migrating to Taiwan by 4,000 BP These immigrants included people from the foxtail millet-cultivating Longshan culture of Shandong (with Longshan-type cultures found in southern Taiwan), the fishing-based Dapenkeng culture of coastal Fujian and the Yuanshan culture of northernmost Taiwan which Blench suggests may have originated from the coast of Guangdong. Based on geography and cultural vocabulary, Blench believes that the Yuanshan people may have spoken Northeast Formosan languages. Thus, Blench believes that there is in fact no "apical" ancestor of Austronesian in the sense that there was no true single Proto-Austronesian language that gave rise to present-day Austronesian languages. Instead, multiple migrations of various pre-Austronesian peoples and languages from the Chinese mainland that were related but distinct came together to form what we now know as Austronesian in Taiwan. Hence, Blench considers the single-migration model into Taiwan by pre-Austronesians to be inconsistent with both the archaeological and linguistic (lexical) evidence.

Migration from Taiwan

The Austronesian expansion (also called the "Out of Taiwan" model) is a large-scale migration of Austronesians from Taiwan, occurring around 1500-1000 BCE. Population growth primarily fueled this migration. These first settlers settled in northern Luzon in the archipelago of the Philippines, intermingling with the earlier Australo-Melanesian population who had inhabited the islands since about 23,000 years earlier. Over the next thousand years, Austronesian peoples migrated southeast to the rest of the Philippines, and into the islands of the Celebes Sea, Borneo, and Indonesia. The Austronesians that spread westward through Maritime Southeast Asia also colonized parts of mainland Southeast Asia.

Soon after reaching the Philippines, Austronesians colonized the Northern Mariana Islands by 1500 BCE and Palau and Yap by 1000 BCE, becoming the first humans to reach Remote Oceania. Another important migration branch was by the Lapita culture, which rapidly spread into the islands off the coast of northern New Guinea and into the Solomon Islands and other parts of Island Melanesia by 1200 BCE. They reached the islands of Fiji, Samoa and Tonga by around 900 to 800 BCE. This remained the furthest extent of the Austronesian expansion into Polynesia until around 700 CE when there was another surge of island colonization. They reached the Cook Islands, Tahiti, and the Marquesas by 700 CE; Hawaii by 900 CE; Rapa Nui by 1000 CE; and New Zealand by 1200 CE. There is also putative evidence, based in the spread of the sweet potato, that Austronesians may have reached South America from Polynesia where they traded with American Indians.

In the Indian Ocean, they sailed west from Maritime Southeast Asia; the Austronesian peoples reached Madagascar in the second half of the first millennium CE.

Alternative views 

A competing hypothesis to the "Out of Taiwan" model is the "Out of Sundaland" hypothesis, favored by a minority of authors. Notable proponents include William Meacham, Stephen Oppenheimer, and Wilhelm Solheim. For various reasons, they proposed that the homelands of Austronesians were within Island Southeast Asia (ISEA), particularly in the Sundaland landmass drowned during the end of the Last Glacial Period by rising sea levels. Proponents of these hypotheses point to the ancient origins of mtDNA in Southeast Asian populations, pre-dating the Austronesian expansion, as proof that Austronesians originated from within Island Southeast Asia.

However, these have been repudiated by studies using whole genome sequencing which has found that all ISEA populations had genes originating from the aboriginal Taiwanese. Contrary to the claim of a south-to-north migration in the "Out of Sundaland" hypothesis, the new whole genome analysis strongly confirms the north-to-south dispersal of the Austronesian peoples in the prevailing "Out of Taiwan" hypothesis. The researchers further pointed out that while humans have been living in Sundaland for at least 40,000 years, the Austronesian people were recent arrivals. The results of the previous studies failed to take into account admixture with the more ancient but unrelated Negrito and Papuan populations.

Historical period 

By the beginning of the first millennium CE, most of the Austronesian inhabitants in Maritime Southeast Asia began trading with India and China. The adoption of Hindu statecraft model allowed the creation of Indianized kingdoms such as Tarumanagara, Champa, Butuan, Langkasuka, Melayu, Srivijaya, Mataram, Majapahit, and Bali. Between the 5th to 15th century Hinduism and Buddhism were established as the main religion in the region.
Muslim traders from the Arabian peninsula were thought to have brought Islam by the 10th century. Islam was established as the dominant religion in the Malay archipelago by the 16th century . The Austronesian inhabitants of Near Oceania and Remote Oceania were unaffected by this cultural trade and retained their indigenous culture in the Pacific region.

Kingdom of Larantuka in Flores, East Nusa Tenggara was the only Christian (Roman Catholic) indigenous kingdom in Indonesia and in Southeast Asia, with the first king named Lorenzo.

Western Europeans in search of spices and gold later colonized most of the Austronesian-speaking countries of the Asia-Pacific region, beginning from the 16th century with the Portuguese and Spanish colonization of the Philippines, Palau, Guam, the Mariana Islands, and some parts of Indonesia (present-day East Timor); the Dutch colonization of the Indonesian archipelago; the British colonization of Malaysia and Oceania; the French colonization of French Polynesia; and later, the American governance of the Pacific.

Meanwhile, the British, Germans, French, Americans, and Japanese began establishing spheres of influence within the Pacific Islands during the 19th and early 20th centuries. The Japanese later invaded most of Southeast Asia and some parts of the Pacific during World War II. The latter half of the 20th century initiated independence of modern-day Indonesia, Malaysia, East Timor and many of the Pacific Island nations, as well as the re-independence of the Philippines.

Culture 
The native culture of Austronesia varies from region to region. The early Austronesian peoples considered the sea as the basic feature of their life. Following their diaspora to Southeast Asia and Oceania, they migrated by boat to other islands. Boats of different sizes and shapes have been found in every Austronesian culture, from Madagascar, Maritime Southeast Asia, to Polynesia, and have different names.
In Southeast Asia, head-hunting was restricted to the highlands as a result of warfare. Mummification is only found among the highland Austronesian Filipinos, and in some Indonesian groups in Celebes and Borneo.

Ships and sailing

Sea-going catamaran and outrigger ship technologies were the most important innovations of the Austronesian peoples. They were the first humans with vessels capable of crossing vast distances of water, which enabled them to colonize the Indo-Pacific in prehistoric times. Austronesian groups continue to be the primary users of the outrigger canoes today.

Early researchers like Heine-Geldern (1932) and Hornell (1943) once believed that catamarans evolved from outrigger canoes, but modern authors specializing in Austronesian cultures like Doran (1981) and Mahdi (1988) now believe it to be the opposite.

Two canoes bound together developed directly from minimal raft technologies of two logs tied together. Over time, the double-hulled canoe form developed into the asymmetric double canoe, where one hull is smaller than the other. Eventually the smaller hull became the prototype outrigger, giving way to the single outrigger canoe, then to the reversible single outrigger canoe. Finally, the single outrigger types developed into the double outrigger canoe (or trimarans).

This would also explain why older Austronesian populations in Island Southeast Asia tend to favor double outrigger canoes, as it keeps the boats stable when tacking. But they still have small regions where catamarans and single-outrigger canoes are still used. In contrast, more distant outlying descendant populations in Micronesia, Polynesia, Madagascar, and the Comoros retained the double-hull and the single outrigger canoe types, but the technology for double outriggers never reached them (although it exists in western Melanesia). To deal with the problem of the instability of the boat when the outrigger faces leeward when tacking, they instead developed the shunting technique in sailing, in conjunction with reversible single-outriggers.

The simplest form of all ancestral Austronesian boats had five parts. The bottom part consists of a single piece of hollowed-out log. At the sides were two planks, and two horseshoe-shaped wood pieces formed the prow and stern. These were fitted tightly together edge-to-edge with dowels inserted into holes in between, and then lashed to each other with ropes (made from rattan or fibre) wrapped around protruding lugs on the planks. This characteristic and ancient Austronesian boat-building practice is known as the "lashed-lug" technique. They were commonly caulked with pastes made from various plants as well as tapa bark and fibres which would expand when wet, further tightening joints and making the hull watertight. They formed the shell of the boat, which was then reinforced by horizontal ribs. Shipwrecks of Austronesian ships can be identified from this construction, as well as the absence of metal nails. Austronesian ships traditionally had no central rudders but were instead steered using an oar on one side.

The ancestral rig was the mastless triangular crab claw sail which had two booms that could be tilted to the wind. These were built in the double-canoe configuration or had a single outrigger on the windward side. In Island Southeast Asia, these developed into double outriggers on each side that provided greater stability. The triangular crab claw sails also later developed into square or rectangular tanja sails, which like crab claw sails, had distinctive booms spanning the upper and lower edges. Fixed masts also developed later in both Southeast Asia (usually as bipod or tripod masts) and Oceania. Austronesians traditionally made their sails from woven mats of the resilient and salt-resistant pandanus leaves. These sails allowed Austronesians to embark on long-distance voyaging. In some cases, however, they were one-way voyages. The failure of pandanus to establish populations in Rapa Nui and New Zealand is believed to have isolated their settlements from the rest of Polynesia.

The ancient Champa of Vietnam also uniquely developed basket-hulled boats whose hulls were composed of woven and resin-caulked bamboo, either entirely or in conjunction with plank strakes. They range from small coracles (the o thúng) to large ocean-going trading ships like the ghe mành.

The acquisition of the catamaran and outrigger technology by the non-Austronesian peoples in Sri Lanka and southern India is due to the result of very early Austronesian contact with the region, including the Maldives and the Laccadive Islands, estimated to have occurred around 1000 to 600 BCE and onwards. This may have possibly included limited colonization that have since been assimilated. This is still evident in Sri Lankan and South Indian languages. For example, Tamil paṭavu, Telugu paḍava, and Kannada paḍahu, all meaning "ship", are all derived from Proto-Hesperonesian *padaw, "sailboat", with Austronesian cognates like Javanese perahu, Kadazan padau, Maranao padaw, Cebuano paráw, Samoan folau, Hawaiian halau, and Māori wharau.

Architecture 
Austronesian architecture is a vernacular highly diverse, often with striking designs; but they all share certain characteristics that indicate a common origin. The reconstructed Proto-Austronesian and Proto-Malayo-Polynesian forms of various terms for "house", "building", or "granary" among the different linguistic subgroups of Austronesians include *Rumaq ("house"); *balay ("public building", "community house", or "guest house"); *lepaw ("hut", "field hut", or "granary"); *kamaliR ("bachelor's house" or "men's house"); and *banua ("inhabited land" or "community territory").

The most ubiquitous common feature of Austronesian structures is the raised floor. The structures are raised on piles, usually with space underneath also utilized for storage or domestic animals. The raised design had multiple advantages, they mitigate damage during flooding and (in very tall examples) can act as defensive structures during conflicts. The house posts are also distinctively capped with larger-diameter discs at the top, to prevent vermin and pests from entering the structures by climbing them. Austronesian houses and other structures are usually built in wetlands and alongside bodies of water, but can also be built in the highlands or even directly on shallow water.

Building structures on pilings is believed to be derived from the design of raised granaries and storehouses, which are highly important status symbols among the ancestrally rice-cultivating Austronesians. The rice granary shrine was also the archetypal religious building among Austronesian cultures and was used to store carvings of ancestor spirits and local deities.

Another common feature are pitched roofs with ornamented gables. The most notable of which are the saddlebacked roofs, a design common for longhouses used for village meetings or ceremonies. The overall effect of which is reminiscent of boats, underlining the strong maritime connections of Austronesian cultures. The boat motif is common throughout, particularly in eastern Indonesia. In some ethnic groups, the houses are built on platforms that resemble catamarans. Among the Nage people, a woven representation of a boat is added to the ridge of the roof; among the Manggarai people, the roofs of houses are shaped like an upside-down boat; while among the people of Tanimbar and eastern Flores, the ridge itself is carved into a representation of a boat. Furthermore, elements of Austronesian structures (as well as society in general) are often referred to in terminologies used for boats and sailing. These include calling elements of structures as "masts", "sails", or "rudders" or calling the village leaders as "captains" or "steersmen". In the case of the Philippines, the villages themselves are referred to as barangay, from an alternate form of balangay, a type of sailboat used for trading and colonization.

Austronesian buildings have spiritual significance, often containing what is coined by anthropologist James J. Fox as a "ritual attractor." These are specific posts, beams, platforms, altars, and so on that embody the house as a whole, usually consecrated at the time of building.

The Austronesian house itself also often symbolizes various aspects of indigenous Austronesian cosmology and animism. In the majority of cases, the loft of the house (usually placed above the hearth), is considered to be the domain of deities and spirits. It is essentially a raised granary built into the structure of the house itself and functioned as a second floor. It is usually used to store sacred objects (like effigies of granary idols or deceased ancestors), heirlooms, and other important objects. These areas are usually not part of the regular living space, and may only be accessible to certain members of the family or after performing a specific ritual. Other parts of the house may also be associated with certain deities, and thus certain activities like receiving guests or conducting marriage ceremonies can only be performed in specific areas.

While rice cultivation wasn't among the technologies carried into Remote Oceania, raised storehouses still survived. The pataka of the Māori people is an example. The largest pataka are elaborately adorned with carvings and are often the tallest buildings in the Māori pā. These were used to store implements, weapons, ships, and other valuables; while smaller patakas were used to store provisions. A special type of pataka supported by a single tall post also had ritual importance and were used to isolate high-born children during their training for leadership.

The majority of Austronesian structures are not permanent. They are made from perishable materials like wood, bamboo, plant fibre, and leaves. Similar to traditional Austronesian boats, they do not use nails but are traditionally constructed solely by joints, weaving, ties, and dowels. Elements of the structures are repaired and replaced regularly or as they get damaged. Because of this, archaeological records of prehistoric Austronesian structures are usually limited to traces of house posts, with no way of determining the original building plans.

Indirect evidence of traditional Austronesian architecture, however, can be gleaned from their contemporary representations in art, like in friezes on the walls of later Hindu-Buddhist stone temples (like in reliefs in Borobudur and Prambanan). But these are limited to the recent centuries. They can also be reconstructed linguistically from shared terms for architectural elements, like ridge-poles, thatch, rafters, house posts, hearth, notched log ladders, storage racks, public buildings, and so on. Linguistic evidence also makes it clear that stilt houses were already present among Austronesian groups since at least the Late Neolithic.

In modern Indonesia, varying styles are collectively known as Rumah adat.

Arbi et al. (2013) have also noted the striking similarities between Austronesian architecture and Japanese traditional raised architecture (shinmei-zukuri). Particularly the buildings of the Ise Grand Shrine, which contrast with the pit-houses typical of the Neolithic Yayoi period. They propose significant Neolithic contact between the people of southern Japan and Austronesians or pre-Austronesians that occurred prior to the spread of Han Chinese cultural influence to the islands. Rice cultivation is also believed to have been introduced to Japan from a para-Austronesian group from coastal eastern China. Waterson (2009) has also argued that the architectural tradition of stilt houses is originally Austronesian, and that similar building traditions in Japan and mainland Asia (notably among Kra-Dai and Austroasiatic-speaking groups) correspond to contacts with a prehistoric Austronesian network.

Pottery 

Outside of Taiwan, assemblages of red-slipped pottery, plainware, and incised and stamped pottery associated with the Austronesian migrations are first documented from around 2000 to 1800 BCE in the northern Philippines, from sites in the Batanes Islands and the Cagayan Valley of Northern Luzon. From there pottery technology rapidly spread to the east, south, and southwest.

This type of pottery dispersed south and southwest to the rest of Island Southeast Asia. The eastward and the southward branches of the migrations converged in Island Melanesia resulting in what is now known as the Lapita culture centered around the Bismarck Archipelago.

The oldest known pottery assemblages in Oceania are circle and punctate/dentate-stamped pottery in the Marianas Islands, securely dated to 1500 BCE to 1300 BCE from multiple archaeological sites. It pre-dates the earliest Lapita culture pottery assemblages (c. 1350 to 1300 BCE) and bears closest resemblance to a subset of the more diverse Nagsabaran pottery of the northern Philippines. It is currently disputed on whether this is indicative of a direct ancient voyage from the northern Philippines to the Marianas. Hung et al. (2011) proposed a direct deliberate voyage from eastern Luzon, which would make it the longest sea-crossing undertaken by that time in human history. This has also been proposed by earlier authors like Blust (2000) and Reid (2002) based on linguistics.

Winter et al. (2012), on the other hand, dismissed the similarities as being generic rather than specific to the region. This is from both analysis of the microscopic structure of the shards (indicating manufacturing techniques) and the impossibility of drift voyaging from Luzon due to the prevailing wind and currents. Instead of a voyage directly from Luzon, they instead proposed an origin either from a direct single voyage from Mindanao (southern Philippines) or Morotai (Maluku Islands) to Guam; or two voyages, with way-stations in Palau or Yap.

Hung et al. (2012) has pointed out in response that no pottery assemblages older than 2000 years old have been found in Morotai, which also has a Papuan-speaking population. They also pointed out that present-day data on wind and currents is not a reliable way of ascertaining migration routes, and that the voyages settling Remote Oceania would have been deliberate, not uncontrolled drifting. Similar presumptions by Thor Heyerdahl led to his erroneous conclusion that Polynesia was settled from the Americas. Pottery manufacturing techniques are also diverse, even within a single community. Thus analysis of manufacturing methods is less significant than comparison of decorative systems. Nevertheless, Hung et al. (2012) emphasized that they also did not discount other sources (yet undiscovered) from the southern Philippines. They also propose the Eastern Visayas as a likely point-of-origin. Sources south of the Philippines remain unlikely without further archaeological findings due to their related pottery assemblages being younger than 1500 BCE.

The dentate-stamped pottery of the Lapita culture (c. 1350 to 1300 BCE) also retained elements also found in the Nagsabaran pottery in the Philippines, including stamped circles as well as the cross-in-circle motif. They carried pottery technology as far as Tonga in Polynesia. Pottery technology in Tonga, however, became reduced to undecorated plainware within only two centuries before abruptly disappearing completely by around 400 BCE. The reasons for this are still unknown. Pottery was absent in subsequent migrations to the rest of Remote Oceania, being replaced instead with carved wooden or bamboo containers, bottle gourds, and baskets. However, the geometric designs and stylized figures used in the pottery are still present in other surviving artforms like in tattooing, weaving, and barkcloth patterns.

A common practice among Austronesians in a large area of Island Southeast Asia is the use of burial jars which emerged during the Late Neolithic and flourished in the first millennium CE. They are characteristic of a region bordered by the Philippines to the north, southern Sumatra in the southwest, and Sumba and the Maluku Islands in the southeast. However, these didn't comprise a single tradition, but can be grouped into at least fourteen different traditions scattered across the islands. In most cases, the earliest burial jars used were large indigenous earthenware jars, followed by indigenous or imported stoneware jars (martaban), and finally imported porcelain jars acquired from the burgeoning maritime trade with China and Mainland Southeast Asia at around the 14th century CE.

Music and dance 

Slit drums are indigenous Austronesian musical instrument that were invented and used by the Southeast Asian-Austronesian, and Oceanic-Austronesian ethnic groups.

Gong ensembles are also a common musical heritage of Island Southeast Asia. The casting of gong instruments are believed to have originated from the Bronze Age cultures of Mainland Southeast Asia. It spread to Austronesian islands initially through trade as prestige goods. However, Mainland Asian gongs were never used in ensembles. The innovation of using gong sets is uniquely Austronesian. Gong ensembles are found in western Malayo-Polynesian groups, though they never penetrated much further east. There are roughly two gong ensemble traditions among Austronesians, which also produced gongs in ancient times.

In western Island Southeast Asia, these traditions are collectively known as Gamelan, being centred on the island of Java in Indonesia. It includes the Celempung of the Malay Peninsula, Talempung of northern Sumatra, Caklempung of central Sumatra, Chalempung of southern Sumatra, Bonang of Java, Kromong of western Kalimantan, Engkromong of Sarawak, and Trompong of western Nusa Tenggara.

In eastern Island Southeast Asia, these traditions are known as Kulintang and are centred in Mindanao and the Sulu archipelago of the southern Philippines. It includes the Kulintangan of Sabah and Palawan, Kolintang of northern Sulawesi, Kulintang of Halmahera and Timor, and the Totobuang of the southern Maluku Islands.

Jade carving

The ancestral pre-Austronesian Liangzhu culture (3400–2250 BCE) of the Yangtze River delta was one of the ancient centres of Neolithic jade carving. Jade was spread to Taiwan by around 3,000 BCE, then further into the Philippines at 2,000 BCE and Vietnam at 1,800–1,500 BCE. All of them began to produce various tools and ornaments in indigenous jade workshops, including adzes, bracelets, beads, and rings.

The most notable jade products of these regions were the vast amounts of penannular and double-headed earrings and pendants known as lingling-o, primarily produced in the Philippines and the Sa Huỳnh culture of Vietnam, though remarkably mostly with the raw jade material sourced from eastern Taiwan. These typically depict two-headed animals or were ring-shaped with side projections. They were indicative of a very active ancient maritime trading region that imported and exported raw jade and finished jade ornaments known as the Sa Huynh-Kalanay Interaction Sphere. They were produced during a period between 500 BCE to as late as 1000 CE, although later examples were replaced with metal, wood, bone, clay, green mica, black nephrite, or shell materials, rather than green jade.

Polished and ground stone adzes, gouges, and other implements, some of which are made from jade-like stone, have also been recorded in areas of Island Melanesia and eastern New Guinea associated with the Lapita culture. These were considered valuable currency and were primarily used to trade for goods. In 2012, a Lapita culture jadeite gouge used for wood carving was found in Emirau Island in the Bismarck Archipelago. It was dated to around 3,300 BP, but the origin of the jade material is unknown. Similar prestige stone tools have also been found in New Caledonia.

Jade was absent in most of Remote Oceania, due to the lack of jade deposits. However, there is putative evidence that Polynesians may have remained familiar with jade and may have acquired them through prehistoric trade contacts with New Caledonia, Island Melanesia, and/or New Zealand.

Jade carving traditions reappeared among the Māori people of New Zealand. These were produced from locally sourced  (greenstone) and were used to produce  (treasure). Bellwood et al. (2011) has suggested that the reappearance of these motifs might be evidence of a preserved tradition of Southeast Asian jade motifs (perhaps carved in perishable wood, bone, or shell by Polynesians prior to the reacquisition of a jade source), or they might even be the result of a later Iron Age contact between eastern Polynesia and the Philippines.

Rock art 

There are around six hundred to seven hundred rock art sites discovered in Southeast Asia and Island Melanesia, as well as over eight hundred megalithic sites. The sites specifically associated with the Austronesian expansion contain examples of indigenous pictograms and petroglyphs. Within Southeast Asia, the sites associated with Austronesians can be divided into three general rock art traditions: the Megalithic Culture of Borneo, Sulawesi, and the Greater Sunda Islands; the Austronesian Painting Tradition of the Lesser Sunda Islands, coastal New Guinea, and Island Melanesia; and the Austronesian Engraving Style of Papua New Guinea and Island Melanesia. Despite proximity, these traditions can be distinguished readily from the Australo-Melanesian rock art traditions of Australia (except the Torres Strait Islands) as well as the interior highlands of New Guinea, indicating the borders of the extent of the Austronesian expansion.

Dating rock art is difficult, but some of the sites subjected to direct dating pre-date Austronesian arrival, like the Lene Hara paintings of East Timor which has an age range of 6,300 to 26,000 BP. Conversely, others are more recent and can be dated indirectly by their subjects. The depictions of pottery, ships, and metal objects, for example, put certain rock art sites at a range of 2,000 to 4,000 BP. Some hunter-gatherer groups have also continued to produce rock art well into the present period, as evidenced by their modern subjects.

The Megalithic Culture is mostly limited to western Island Southeast Asia, with the greatest concentration being western Indonesia. While most sites aren't dated, the age ranges of dating sites are between the 2nd to 16th century CE. They are divided into two phases. The first is an older megalithic tradition associated with the Neolithic Austronesian rectangular axe culture (2,500 to 1,500 BCE); while the second is the 3rd or 4th century BCE megalithic tradition associated with the (non-Austronesian) Dong Son culture of Vietnam. Prasetyo (2006) suggests that the megalithic traditions are not originally Austronesian, but rather innovations acquired through trade with India and China, but this has little to no evidence in the intervening regions in Thailand, Vietnam, and the Philippines.

The Austronesian Painting Traditions (APT) are the most common types of rock art in Island Southeast Asia. They consist of scenes and pictograms typically found in rock shelters and caves near coastal areas. They are characteristically rendered in red ochre pigments for the earlier forms, later sometimes superseded by paintings done in black charcoal pigments. Their sites are mostly clustered in Eastern Indonesia and Island Melanesia, although a few examples can be found in the rest of Island Southeast Asia. Their occurrence has a high correlation to Austronesian-speaking areas, further evidenced by the appearance of metal (bronze) artifacts in the paintings. They are mostly found near the coastlines. Their common motifs include hand stencils, "sun-ray" designs, boats, and active human figures with headdresses or weapons and other paraphernalia. They also feature geometric motifs similar to the motifs of the Austronesian Engraving Style. Some paintings are also associated with traces of human burials and funerary rites, including ship burials. The representations of boats themselves are believed to be connected to the widespread "ship of the dead" Austronesian funerary practices.

The earliest APT sites dated is from Vanuatu, which was found to be around 3,000 BP, corresponding to the initial migration wave of the Austronesians. These early sites are largely characterized by face motifs and hand stencils. Later sites from 1,500 BP onwards, however, begin to show regional divergence in their art styles. APT can be readily distinguished from older Pleistocene-era Australo-Melanesian cave paintings by their motifs, color, and composition, though they can often be found in the same locality. The most recognizable motifs of APT (like boats) do not occur in cave paintings (or engravings) that definitely pre-date the Austronesian arrival, the sole exception being the stencilled hand motif. Some APT examples are also characteristically found in relatively inaccessible locations like very high up in cliffsides overlooking the sea. No traces of APT has been found in Taiwan or the Philippines, though there is continuity in the motifs of spirals and concentric circles found in ancestral petroglyphs.

The Austronesian Engraving Style (AES), consisting of petroglyphs carved into rock surfaces, is far less common than APT. The majority of these sites are in coastal New Guinea, and Island Melanesia. AES sites, which can be tentatively traced back to the similar Wanshan petroglyphs of Taiwan, are believed to be largely correlated to the prehistoric extent of the Lapita culture. The common motif of this tradition is curvilinear geometric engravings like spirals, concentric circles, and face-like forms. These resemble the geometric motifs in APT, though they are considered to be two separate artistic traditions. AES is particularly dominant in the Solomon Islands and New Caledonia, where engravings are far more abundant than painted sites.

O'Connor et al. (2015) proposes that APT developed during the initial rapid southward Austronesian expansion, and not before, possibly as a response to the communication challenges brought about by the new maritime mode of living. Along with AES, these material symbols and associated rituals and technologies may been the manifestations of "powerful ideologies" spread by Austronesian settlers that were central to the "Neolithization" and rapid assimilation of the various non-Austronesian indigenous populations of ISEA and Melanesia.

The easternmost islands of Island Melanesia (Vanuatu, Fiji, and New Caledonia) are considered part of Remote Oceania as they are beyond the interisland visibility threshold. These island groups begin to show divergence from the APT and AES traditions of Near Oceania. While their art traditions show a clear continuation of the APT and AES traditions, they also feature innovations unique to each island group, like the increasing use of black charcoal, rectilinear motifs, and being found more inside sacred caves rather than in open cliffsides.

In Micronesia, the rock art traditions can be divided into three general regions: western, central, and eastern Micronesia. The divisions reflect the various major migration waves from the Philippines into the Mariana Islands and Palau at 3,500 BP; a Lapita culture back-migration from Island Melanesia into central and eastern Micronesia at around 2,200 BP; and finally a back-migration from western Polynesia into eastern Micronesia at around 1,000 BP.

In western Micronesia (Palau, Yap, Guam, and the Northern Mariana Islands), rock art primarily consist of paintings on high cave ceilings and sea-facing cliffs. They are very similar to APT in terms of their motifs as well as their relatively inaccessible locations. Common motifs include hand stencils, faces, turtles and fish, concentric circles, and characteristic four-pointed stars. Petroglyphs are rare, but mainly consist of human forms with triangular bodies without heads or arms. This is believed to be connected to the funerary rite of removing the heads from the bodies of deceased relatives. A notable megalithic tradition in western Micronesia are the haligi stone pillars of the Chamorro people. These are capped stone pillars which are believed to have served as supports for raised buildings. They are associated with the Latte period (900 to 1700 CE), when a new wave of migrants from Southeast Asia reintroduced rice cultivation into the islands. Another megalithic tradition is also that of the rai stones, massive doughnut-shaped discs of rock which were used as currency in Yap.

Rock art in central Micronesia (Chuuk, Pohnpei, and Kosrae), in contrast, are dominated by rock engravings with motifs tying it to the rock art traditions of Island Melanesia. They include curvilinear shapes like spirals and concentric circles, tree-like shapes, and the distinctive "enveloped cross" motif. The Pohnpaid petroglyphs are the largest assemblage of rock engravings in the region, with motifs dominated by footprints, enveloped crosses, and outlined "sword-paddles". Central Micronesia also hosts the ruins of the stone cities of Nan Madol (1,180–1,200 CE) and Leluh (1,200–1,800 CE), in the islands of Pohnpei and Kosrae, respectively.

In the low-lying atolls of eastern Micronesia, rock art is rare to nonexistent, due to the absence of suitable rock surfaces for painting or engraving.

In Polynesia, rock art is dominated by petroglyphs, rather than paintings, and they show less variation than the rock art of Near Oceania and ISEA. In the western Polynesian islands nearest to Island Melanesia, rock art is rare (like in Tonga and Samoa) or are absent entirely (like in the Cook Islands). However, petroglyphs are abundant in the islands in the further reaches of the Polynesian triangle, particularly in Hawaii, the Marquesas, and Rapa Nui. Rapa Nui has the densest concentration of engravings in Polynesia as a whole; while the Puuloa petroglyphs site in Hawaii has the largest number of petroglyphs in a single site at over 21,000 engravings. Polynesia also features megalithic sacred ceremonial centres generally known as marae.

In Tonga and Samoa, the existing rock art sites consist mostly of engravings with motifs including curvilinear shapes, human figures, "jellyfish", turtles, birds, and footprints. These are typically carved in natural rock formations or marae sites.

In the central-eastern Polynesian islands, which include the Marquesas and the Society Islands, petroglyphs are more numerous. They show the archetypal Polynesian motifs of turtles, faces, cup-like depressions (cupules), stick-like human figures, boats, fish, curvilinear shapes, and concentric circles. Like in western Polynesia, they are typically carved into marae sites or in rocks beside streams. The existing rock paintings also display the same motifs but are rendered in different styles.

In the Hawaiian islands, the abundant petroglyphs are remarkably all similar in execution. Their common subjects include stick-like human figures, dogs, boats, sails, paddles, footprints, and ceremonial headdresses. Depictions of marine life, however, is rare, unlike the rest of Polynesia. They are typically carved into boulders, lava rock formations, and cliffsides. Red paintings of dogs in cliffsides and caves can also be found in Kauai and Maui. The megalithic traditions of Hawaii can be exemplified by the heiau sacred sites, which can range from simple earth terraces to standing stones.

In Rapa Nui, the engravings are distinctive but still show similarities to the techniques and motifs of the Marquesas. Their motifs commonly include disembodied parts of the human body (vulvae in particular), animals, plants, ceremonial objects, and boats. A prominent motif is also that of the "birdman" figure which is associated with the tangata manu cult of Makemake. The most well-known rock art assemblage of Rapa Nui, however, are the moai megaliths. A few paintings mostly of birds and boats have also been discovered which are associated with the engravings, rather than being separate artforms.

The rock art in New Zealand can be divided into two regions. North Island features more engravings than paintings, while South Island is unique in that it is the only Polynesian island where there are more paintings than engravings. New Zealand rock paintings are done in red and black pigments and can sometimes be found in inaccessible heights. They typically depict human figures (particularly a front-facing human figure with flexed arms), birds, lizards, dogs, fish, and what has been identified as "birdmen". Engravings in open spaces like cliffsides are generally of spirals and curvilinear shapes, while engravings in enclosed caves and shelters depict faces and boats. The same motifs can also be seen in dendroglyphs on living trees.

Body art

Body art among Austronesian peoples is common, especially elaborate tattooing which is one of the most well-known pan-Austronesian traditions.

Tattooing
In modern times, tattoos are usually associated with Polynesian culture, due to the highly influential accounts of James Cook in his explorations of the Pacific in the 18th century. Cook introduced the word "tattoo" (archaic: "tattaow", "tattow") into the English vocabulary, from Tahitian and Samoan tātau ("to tap"). However, tattoos exist prominently in various other Austronesian groups prior to contacts with other cultures.

Tattoos had various functions among Austronesian societies. Among men, they were strongly linked to the widespread practice of head-hunting raids. In head-hunting societies, tattoos were records of how many heads the warriors had taken in battle, and was part of the initiation rites into adulthood. The number and location of tattoos, therefore, were indicative of a warrior's status and prowess.

Among the Indigenous Taiwanese, tattoos were present for both men and women. Among the Tayal people, facial tattoos are dominant. They indicated maturity and skill in weaving and farming for women, and skill in hunting and battle for men. Like in most of Austronesia, tattooing traditions in Taiwan have largely disappeared due to the Sinicization of native peoples after the Chinese colonization of Taiwan in the 17th century, as well as conversion to Christianity. Most of the remaining tattoos are only found among elders.

One of the earliest descriptions of Austronesian tattoos by Europeans was during the 16th century Spanish expeditions to the Philippines, beginning with the first voyage of circumnavigation by Ferdinand Magellan. The Spanish encountered the heavily tattooed Visayan people in the Visayas Islands, whom they named the "Pintados" (Spanish for "the painted ones"). However, Philippine tattooing traditions (batok) have mostly been lost as the natives of the islands converted to Christianity and Islam, though they are still practiced in isolated groups in the highlands of Luzon and Mindanao. Philippine tattoos were usually geometric patterns or stylized depictions of animals, plants, and human figures. Some of the few remaining traditional tattoos in the Philippines are from elders of the Igorot peoples. Most of these were records of war exploits against the Japanese during World War II.

Among the Māori of New Zealand, tattoos (moko) were originally carved into the skin using bone chisels (uhi) rather than through puncturing as in usual practice. In addition to being pigmented, the skin was also left raised into ridges of swirling patterns.

Dental modification

Teeth blackening was the custom of dyeing one's teeth black with various tannin-rich plant dyes. It was practiced throughout almost the entire range of Austronesia, including Island Southeast Asia, Madagascar, Micronesia, and Island Melanesia, reaching as far east as Malaita. However, it was absent in Polynesia. It also existed in non-Austronesian populations in Mainland Southeast Asia and Japan. The practice was primarily preventative, as it reduced the chances of developing tooth decay similar to modern dental sealants. It also had cultural significance and was seen as beautiful. A common sentiment was that blackened teeth separated humans from animals.

Teeth blackening was often done in conjunction with other modifications to the teeth associated with beauty standards, including dental evulsion and teeth filing.

Religion 
The religious traditions of the Austronesian people focus mostly on ancestral spirits, nature spirits and gods. It is basically a complex animistic religion. Mythologies vary by culture and geographical location but share common basic aspects such as ancestor worship, animism, shamanism and the belief in a spirit world and powerful deities. There is also a great amount of shared mythology and a common belief in Mana.

Currently, many of these beliefs have gradually been replaced. Examples of native religions include: Indigenous Philippine folk religions (including beliefs on the Anito), Sunda Wiwitan, Kejawen, Kaharingan or the Māori religion. Many Austronesian religious beliefs were incorporated into foreign religions introduced unto them, such as Hinduism, Buddhism, Christianity and Islam.

Writing

With the possible exception of rongorongo on Rapa Nui, Austronesians did not have an indigenous writing system but rather adopted or developed writing systems after contact with various non-Austronesian cultures. There are various forms of symbolic communication by pictograms and petroglyphs, but these did not encode language.

Rongorongo, said to have originally been called kohau motu mo rongorongo ("lines of inscriptions for chanting out"), is the only pre-contact indigenous Austronesian system of glyphs that appear to be true writing or at least proto-writing. They consist of around 120 glyphs, ranging from representations of plants to animals, celestial objects, and geometric shapes. The wood allegedly came from toromiro and makoi trees, which is notable given that Rapa Nui was completely deforested at the time of European contact. Although of the surviving two dozen tablets, a few were made from trees introduced after European contact, as well as wood originating from European ships and driftwood. Rapa Nui also has a very rich assemblage of petroglyphs largely associated with the tangata manu ("birdman") cult of Makemake. Although some rongorongo glyphs may have been derived from these petroglyphs, rongorongo does not appear in any of the abundant rock carvings in Rapa Nui and seems to be restricted to the wooden tablets.

The tablets were first described by an outsider in 1864 by the Catholic missionary Eugène Eyraud who said they were found "in all the houses." However, he paid them little attention and they remained unnoticed by the outside world. It wasn't until 1869 that one of the tablets came into the possession of Florentin-Étienne Jaussen, the Bishop of Tahiti. He brought the tablets to the world's attention and instructed the Rapa Nui mission to gather more information about them. But by then, most of the tablets were allegedly already destroyed, presumed to have been used as fuel by the natives in the deforested island.

At the time of discovery of the tablets, Rapa Nui had undergone severe depopulation. This was largely due to the loss of the island's last trees and the Peruvian and Chilean slave raids in the early 1860s. The literate ruling classes of the Rapa Nui people (including the royal family and the religious caste) and the majority of the island's population were kidnapped or killed in the slave raids. Most of those taken died after only one or two years in captivity from the harsh working conditions and European diseases. Succeeding epidemics of smallpox and tuberculosis further decimated the island's population to the point that there were not enough people to bury the dead. The last remnants of the Rapa Nui people were assimilated by the Tahitians who were later brought to the island in an effort to repopulate it, further resulting in the loss of most of the Old Rapa Nui language.

Oral tradition holds that the ruling classes were the only ones who could read the tablets, and the ability to decipher the tablets was lost along with them. Numerous attempts have been made to read the tablets, starting from a few years after their discovery. But to this day, none have proven successful. Some authors have proposed that rongorongo may have been an attempt to imitate European script after the idea of writing was introduced during the "signing" of the 1770 Spanish Treaty of Annexation or through knowledge of European writing acquired elsewhere. They cite various reasons including the lack of attestation of rongorongo prior to the 1860s, the clearly more recent provenance of some of the tablets, the lack of antecedents, and the lack of additional archaeological evidence since its discovery. Others argue that it was merely a mnemonic list of symbols meant to guide incantations. Whether rongorongo is merely an example of trans-cultural diffusion, or a true indigenous Austronesian writing system (and one of the few independent inventions of writing in human history) remains unknown and may never be known.
In Southeast Asia, the first true writing systems of pre-modern Austronesian cultures were all derived from the Grantha and Pallava Brahmic scripts, all of which are abugidas from South India. Various forms of abugidas spread throughout Austronesian cultures in Southeast Asia as kingdoms became Indianized through early maritime trading. The oldest use of abugida scripts in Austronesian cultures are 4th century stone inscriptions written in Cham script from Vietnam. There are numerous other Brahmic-derived writing systems among Southeast Asian Austronesians, usually specific to a certain ethnic group. Notable examples include Balinese, Batak, Baybayin, Buhid, Hanunó'o, Javanese, Kulitan, Lontara, Old Kawi, Rejang, Rencong, Sundanese, and Tagbanwa. They vary from having letters with rounded shapes to letters with sharp cuneiform-like angles; a result of the difference in writing mediums, with the former being ideal for writing on soft leaves and the latter ideal for writing on bamboo panels. The use of the scripts ranged from mundane records to encoding esoteric knowledge on magico-religious rituals and folk medicine.

In regions which converted to Islam, abjads derived from the Arabic script started replacing the earlier abugidas at around the 13th century in Southeast Asia. Madagascar, as well, adopted the Arabic script in the 14th century. Abjads, however, have an even greater inherent problem with encoding Austronesian languages than abugidas, because Austronesian languages have more varied and salient vowels which the Arabic script can not usually encode. As a result, the Austronesian adaptations such as the Jawi and the Pegon scripts have been modified with a system of diacritics that encode sounds, both vowels and consonants, native to Austronesian languages but absent in Semitic languages. With the advent of the Colonial Era, almost all of these writing systems have been replaced with alphabets adapted from the Latin alphabet, as in the Hawaiian alphabet, Filipino alphabet, and Malay alphabet; however, several Formosan languages had been written in zhuyin, and Cia-Cia off Sulawesi has experimented with hangul.

On Woleai and surrounding islands, a script was developed for the Woleaian language in the early 20th century. Approximately 20% of the script's letterforms were borrowed from Latin letters; the remaining characters seem to have been derived from indigenous iconography. Despite this heavy Latin influence, the script was a syllabary.

Vanuatu has a unique tradition of sand drawing, by which images are created by a single continuous line drawn in the sand. It is believed to have functioned as a means of symbolic communication in pre-contact Island Melanesia, especially between travelers and ethnic groups that do not speak the same language. The sand drawings consist of around 300 different designs, and seem to be shared across language groups. In the 1990s, elements of the drawings were adapted into a modern constructed script called Avoiuli by the Turaga indigenous movement on Pentecost Island.

Genetic studies

Genetic studies have been done on the people and related groups. The Haplogroup O1 (Y-DNA)a-M119 genetic marker is frequently detected in Native Taiwanese, northern Philippines and Polynesians, as well as some people in Indonesia, Malaysia and non-Austronesian populations in southern China.
A 2007 analysis of the DNA recovered from human remains in archaeological sites of prehistoric peoples along the Yangtze River in China also shows high frequencies of Haplogroup O1 in the Neolithic Liangzhu culture, linking them to Austronesian and Tai-Kadai peoples. The Liangzhu culture existed in coastal areas around the mouth of the Yangtze. Haplogroup O1 was absent in other archaeological sites inland. The authors of the study suggest that this may be evidence of two different human migration routes during the peopling of Eastern Asia; one coastal and the other inland, with little gene flow between them.

An important breakthrough in studies in Austronesian genetics was the identification of the "Polynesian motif" (Haplogroup B4a1a1) in 1989, a specific nine-base-pair deletion mutation in mtDNA. Several studies have shown that it is shared by Polynesians and Island Southeast Asians, with a sub-branch also identified in Madagascar, indicating shared maternal ancestry of Austronesians. Austronesian-speaking regions also have high to moderate frequencies of Haplogroup O1 of the Y-DNA (including Madagascar) indicating shared paternal ancestry, with the exception of Polynesia where the Papuan-derived Haplogroup C2a1 predominates (although lower frequencies of Austronesian Haplogroup O-M122 also exist). This indicates that the Lapita people, the direct ancestors of Polynesians, were likely matrilocal, assimilating Papuan men from outside the community by marriage in Near Oceania, prior to the Polynesian expansion into Remote Oceania.

Moodley et al. (2009) identified two distinct populations of the gut bacteria Helicobacter pylori that accompanied human migrations into Island Southeast Asia and Oceania, called hpSahul and hspMāori. The study sampled Native Australians, Native Taiwanese, highlanders in New Guinea, and Melanesians and Polynesians in New Caledonia, which were then compared with other H. pylori haplotypes from Europeans, Asians, Pacific Islanders, and others. They found that hpSahul diverged from mainland Asian H. pylori populations approximately 31,000 to 37,000 years ago and have remained isolated for 23,000 to 32,000 years confirming the Australo-Melanesian substratum in Island Southeast Asia and New Guinea. hspMāori, on the other hand, is a subpopulation of hpEastAsia, previously isolated from Polynesians (Māori, Tongans, and Samoans) in New Zealand, and three individuals from the Philippines and Japan. The study found hspMāori from Native Taiwanese, Melanesians, Polynesians, and two inhabitants from the Torres Strait Islands, all of which are Austronesian sources. As expected, hspMāori showed greatest genetic diversity in Taiwan, while all non-Taiwanese hspMāori populations belonged to a single lineage they called the "Pacific clade." They also calculated the isolation-with-migration model (IMa), which showed that the divergence of the Pacific clade of hspMāori were unidirectional from Taiwan to the Pacific. This is consistent with the Out-of-Taiwan model of the Austronesian expansion.

On 16 January 2020, the personal genomics company 23andMe added the category "Filipino & Austronesian" after customers with no known Filipino ancestors were getting false positives for 5% or more "Filipino" ancestry in their Ancestry Composition report (the proportion was as high as 75% in Samoa, 71% in Tonga, 68% in Guam, 18% in Hawaii, and 34% in Madagascar). The company's scientists surmised that this was due to the shared Austronesian genetic heritage being incorrectly identified as Filipino ancestry.

A recent study from 2021 found that an ancient preboreal holocene hunter-gatherer from South Sulawesi had ancestry from both a distinct lineage related to modern Papuans and Aboriginal Australians and from an East-Eurasian lineage (represented by modern East Asians). The hunter-gatherer individual had approximately ~50% "Basal-East Asian" ancestry, and was positioned in between modern East Asians and Papuans of Oceania. The authors concluded that East Asian-related ancestry expanded much earlier into Maritime Southeast Asia than previously suggested, long before the expansion of Austroasiatic and Austronesian groups.

Another study about the ancestral composition of modern ethnic groups in the Philippines from 2021 similarly suggests that distinctive Basal-East Asian (East-Eurasian) ancestry originated in Mainland Southeast Asia at ~50,000 BCE, and expanded through multiple migration waves southwards and northwards respectively. Basal-East Asian ancestry, as well as later Austroasiatic ancestry, from Mainland Southeast Asia, arrived into the Philippines prior to the Austronesian expansion. Austronesian-speakers themself are suggested to have arrived on Taiwan and the northern Philippines between 10,000 BCE to 7,000 BCE from coastal Fujian. The authors concluded that the Austronesian expansion into Insular Southeast Asia and Polynesia was outgoing from the Philippines rather than Taiwan, and that modern Austronesian-speaking people have largely ancestry from the earliest Basal-East Asians, Austroasiatic migrants from Mainland Southeast Asia, and Austronesian-speaking seafarers from the Philippines.

Evidence from agriculture

Genomic analysis of cultivated coconut (Cocos nucifera) has shed light on the movements of Austronesian peoples. By examining 10 microsatellite loci, researchers found that there are 2 genetically distinct subpopulations of coconut – one originating in the Indian Ocean, the other in the Pacific Ocean. However, there is evidence of admixture, the transfer of genetic material, between the two populations. Given that coconuts are ideally suited for ocean dispersal, it seems possible that individuals from one population could have floated to the other. However, the locations of the admixture events are limited to Madagascar and coastal east Africa and exclude the Seychelles and Mauritius. Sailing west from Maritime Southeast Asia in the Indian Ocean, the Austronesian peoples reached Madagascar by ca. 50–500 CE, and reached other parts thereafter. This forms a pattern that coincides with the known trade routes of Austronesian sailors. Additionally, there is a genetically distinct sub-population of coconuts on the eastern coast of South America which has undergone a genetic bottleneck resulting from a founder effect; however, its ancestral population is the pacific coconut, which suggests that Austronesian peoples may have sailed as far east as the Americas.

Pre-Columbian contact with the Americas
A genome analysis in 2020 showed Austronesian contact to South America around 1150–1200 CE, the earliest one between Fatu Hiva from the Marquesas Islands, and Colombia.

See also 

 Ancient maritime history
 Domesticated plants and animals of Austronesia
 Malayo-Polynesian languages
 Maritime Silk Road

Notes

References

Books

External links 
 
 
 Books, some online, on Austronesian subjects by the Australian National University
 Encyclopædia Britannica: Austronesian Languages

 
Austronesian culture
Indigenous peoples of Asia
Indigenous peoples of Oceania
Indigenous peoples of Africa
Ethnic groups in Southeast Asia
Ethnic groups in Oceania
Ethnic groups in East Africa
Prehistoric migrations